Deckenia nobilis (cabbage palm or millionaire's salad) is a species of flowering plant in the family Arecaceae. It is monotypic within the genus Deckenia, and is endemic to the Seychelles, where it is threatened by habitat loss. It was described in 1870.

Description

 

This species of palm tree has a distinctive spiny fruit, and produces yellow spines on the trunks of young specimens. 
Adults reach a height of 40 meters.

Distribution and habitat
Deckenia nobilis is endemic to the Seychelles. In the wild, it is found intermittently in lowland forests, at elevations up to 600 metres.

It is in decline due to unregulated or illegal over-harvesting of the edible palm hearts, but certain stands growing on rocky crags and outcrops are very difficult for humans to reach, which tentatively affords them natural protection. Also, some new growth is attributable to tree nurseries on the Seychelles, which raise D. nobilis seedlings and distribute them to the local populace for planting.

References

Oncospermatinae
Endemic flora of Seychelles
Trees of Seychelles
Plants described in 1870
Vulnerable flora of Africa
Taxonomy articles created by Polbot